The Embassy of Croatia in London is the diplomatic mission of Croatia in the United Kingdom. It is located next to the embassies of Mozambique and Liberia on Fitzroy Square.

Gallery

References

External links
Official site

Croatia
Diplomatic missions of Croatia
Croatia–United Kingdom relations
Buildings and structures in the City of Westminster
Fitzrovia